Binisutoy (No String Attached) is a Bengali drama film directed by Atanu Ghosh and produced by Sandeep Agarwal. Released on 20 August 2021, it stars Ritwick Chakraborty and Bangladesh actress Jaya Ahsan.

Plot
Kajal and Sraboni, two people in their mid thirties, meets at a reality game show audition. Common background helps them in striking up a quick bond. A freak accident injures Sraboni and Kajal takes her to the doctor. On the way, they share two engrossing stories from their lives. The captivating human drama culminates in an ironic altercation between them.

Cast
 Ritwick Chakraborty as Kajal
 Jaya Ahsan as Sraboni
 Chandrayee Ghosh  as Jenny
 Samontak Dyuti Maitra as Kaahon
 Koushik Sen as Cousin brother

Awards

Kerala International Film Festival
Madrid Film Festival
Aurangabad International Film
Toulouse Indian Film Festival

Review
The Indian Express-  Atanu Ghosh's film targets the loneliness within
Cinestaan- Engaging drama explains how stories make life meaningful
Asian movie pulse- 
Popcorn - Binisutoy is a complex and a nuanced drama that is so brilliant that it communicates to you on a totally different level.
Binged- A Sharp Yet Unique Look Into Loneliness 
The Daily Eye- Atanu Ghosh's new film weaves a delightful tapestry that defies genre pigeonholing 
Report Wire - Atanu Ghosh's movie targets the loneliness inside
Sangbad Pratidin- ঋত্বিক-জয়া জুটির এ ছবি স্বপ্ন আর বাস্তবের পার্থক্য বোঝায়
Henry Clubs- Atanu Ghosh's film targets inner loneliness
News Today- Atanu Ghosh's Binisutoy An affecting film with a troubling gaze
The telegraph-‘It aims to explore the urge to try living differently through some strange pattern of existence that would bring fulfilment and perhaps some meaning to life’ 
Times of India-There are a lot of emotions attached to releasing a film in theatres

References

Bengali-language Indian films
Indian drama films
2021 films
Films directed by Atanu Ghosh
2010s Bengali-language films